The Skirmish at Adamsville was a minor battle in the American Civil War that was fought between the Union army and the Confederate army in McNairy County, Tennessee, on April 1, 1862. The battle resulted in a Confederate victory.

Shortly before the Battle of Shiloh in 1862, men under Union General Lew Wallace were stationed at Adamsville, Stoney Lonesome, and Crump's Landing in southwest Tennessee. On April 1, Lt. Charles H. Murray of the 5th Ohio Cavalry reported to Wallace that a skirmish near Adamsville ended in defeat for their Union detachment. Murray claimed that his forces were poorly armed and that they were outgunned by the Confederates. He also claimed that his men were very brave and stated that his men didn't flinch "until they had emptied their carbines and pistols.”

References

External links
 http://tn.gov/tsla/cwsb/1862-03-Article-113-Page188.pdf
 https://www.waymarking.com/waymarks/WMTZ7D_Adamsville_In_The_Civil_War_Adamsville_TN

Adamsville
Adamsville
1862 in the American Civil War
1862 in Tennessee
April 1862 events
McNairy County, Tennessee